The family tree of the 25th Dynasty is too complex to show in its entirety and it is not always clear whether a pharaoh is a son or brother of his predecessor. The following is a simplified – yet updated to 2017 – version following the new dynastic arrangement which sees Shebitku as Shabaka's predecessor rather than successor as traditionally stated. 

 denotes a Pharaoh of Ancient Egypt and King of Kush.
  denotes a King of Kush.

References 

Family tree
25